Boltons is a civil parish in the Allerdale district of Cumbria, England. According to the 2001 census it had a population of 585, increasing to 629 at the 2011 Census.  Settlements in the parish include Bolton Low Houses, Bolton New Houses, Mealsgate, Boltongate and Sandale.

Governance
An electoral ward in the same name exists. This ward stretches south to Underskiddaw with a total population of 1,832 as at the 2011 Census.

See also

Listed buildings in Boltons

External links
 Cumbria County History Trust: Boltons (nb: provisional research only – see Talk page)

References

Civil parishes in Cumbria
Allerdale